John Bannon (1943–2015) was an Australian politician, academic, and premier of South Australia.

John Bannon may also refer to:

 John Bannon (priest) (1829–1913), Irish Catholic Jesuit priest
 John Francis Bannon (1905–1986), Jesuit and American West historian